The squirrel-toothed rat (Anisomys imitator), also known as the New Guinea giant rat, powerful-toothed rat, uneven-toothed rat, or narrow-toothed giant rat, is a species of rodent in the family Muridae. It is the only species in the genus Anisomys and is found in New Guinea.

The species has been known to eat karuka nuts (Pandanus julianettii), and growers will put platforms or other obstacles on the trunks of the trees to keep the pests out.

Names
It is known as gudi-ws or gudl-ws in the Kalam language of Papua New Guinea.

References

Rodents of New Guinea

 Rodents of Papua New Guinea
 Old World rats and mice
 Mammals of Western New Guinea
 Mammals described in 1904
Taxa named by Oldfield Thomas
 Taxonomy articles created by Polbot